Rhynchocymba is an extinct genus of prehistoric bony fish that lived during the Pleistocene epoch.

See also

 Prehistoric fish
 List of prehistoric bony fish

References

Pleistocene fish
Prehistoric fish of Asia
Pleistocene animals of Asia